Jeff Wells (born 25 May 1954) is a marathon runner and pastor, originally from Madisonville, Texas, United States.

Running

Wells attended Rice University, majored in history, and was named an All-American four times in cross country and track.

Wells finished first in the 1976 Houston Marathon, the 1976 Dallas White Rock Marathon, the 1977 Honolulu Marathon, the 1977 and 1979 Nike OTC Marathons, the 1980 Stockholm Marathon, and the 1985 Wang New Zealand Marathon.

He came in second place to Bill Rodgers, by just two seconds, in the closest Boston Marathon finish to date, at the 1978 Boston Marathon, finishing in his fastest-ever marathon time of 2:10:15. Wells's time was either the third- or fourth-fastest by an American to that date, behind three runs by Rodgers, one of which was on a New York Marathon course later found to be shorter than the standard marathon length.

He finished fifth, in 2:13:16, at the 1980 U.S. Olympic Marathon Trials in Buffalo, New York, and fourth in the Olympic Trials 10,000-meter run in the same year.

He was the top American finisher, finishing 24th overall, at the 1977 IAAF World Cross Country Championships – Senior men's race.

Pastor
Wells is the founding pastor of the WoodsEdge Community Church in Spring, Texas.

Achievements
Source: ARRS

References

American male marathon runners
1954 births
Living people
Rice University alumni
People from Madisonville, Texas